Vysoká Pec is a municipality and village in Karlovy Vary District in the Karlovy Vary Region of the Czech Republic. It has about 300 inhabitants.

Administrative parts
The village of Rudné is an administrative part of Vysoká Pec.

References

Villages in Karlovy Vary District